Kinmont is a given name and surname. Notable people with the name include:

 Kinmont Hoitsma (1934–2013), American fencer
 Kinmont Willie Armstrong, outlaw in the Anglo-Scottish Border in the 16th century
 Kathleen Kinmont (born 1965), American actress